Ki-woo is a Korean masculine given name. Its meaning differs based on the hanja used to write each syllable of the name. There are 68 hanja with the reading "ki" and 42 hanja with the reading "woo" on the South Korean government's official list of hanja which may be used in given names.

People with this name include:
Lee Ki-woo (born 1981), South Korean actor

See also
List of Korean given names

References

Korean masculine given names